Faces, Forms & Illusions is the debut studio album by the Canadian ambient/electronic music group Delerium that was released on January 6, 1989 on the Dossier label. The album was re-issued in 1997 on Cleopatra Records with the bonus track "Dark Star" added and "Hidden Mask" removed. All songs written by Bill Leeb, except "Monuments of Deceit" and "Mecca", which were co-written by Bill Leeb and Michael Balch.

"Hidden Mask" features samples from the song "Im Nin'alu" by Ofra Haza.

Artwork 
The cover features a black and yellow image of Malcolm Browne's famous photograph of the self-immolation of Thích Quảng Đức, a Vietnamese Buddhist monk, in Saigon in 1963. The monk was protesting President Ngô Đình Diệm's administration for oppressing the Buddhist religion. The photograph drew international attention and persuaded U.S. President John F. Kennedy to withdraw support for Diệm's government. In 1963, Associated Press correspondent Browne's coverage of the event earned the World Press Photo of the Year award.

Track listing

Personnel 
Delerium
Bill Leeb – instruments, production, mixing
Rhys Fulber – instruments (9)
Production and additional personnel
Aimee C. – design
Michael Balch – mixing
Wide World Photos – photography

References

External links 
 

Delerium albums
1989 debut albums